Archduchess Maria Elisabeth of Austria (5 February 1737 – 7 June 1740) was the eldest child of Holy Roman Empress Maria Theresa and Holy Roman Emperor Francis I.

Life

Maria Elisabeth was born on 5 February 1737 at the Schönbrunn Palace in Vienna, Austria. There was no great jubilation at the birth of the child, since her parents, including many courtiers, had wanted a son and heir.

A lively and beautiful child, she soon became the favorite of both her parents. Her grandfather, Emperor Charles VI, spoke with pleasure of his eldest granddaughter, whom he nicknamed Liesl, and often played with her.

During a visit to the Laxenburg Castle on 7 June 1740, Maria Elisabeth suddenly became ill with stomach cramps and vomiting. Throughout the day, the stomach cramps alternated with ever-renewed vomiting until the little archduchess died that night at 9 p.m., at the age of 3. Her father, Francis Stephen, detailed the death of his firstborn child:

Maria Elisabeth was the first member of the Habsburg-Lorraine family to be buried in the Maria Theresa Vault at the Imperial Crypt, in Vienna. One of her younger sisters was given her name.

Ancestry

References

Bibliography
 Egghardt, Hanne: Maria Theresias Kinder. 16 Schicksale zwischen Glanz und Elend. Kremayr & Scheriau, Vienna 2010, .
 Iby, Elfriede: "Marie-Thérèse, biographie d'une souveraine".
 

House of Habsburg-Lorraine
1737 births
1740 deaths
Austrian princesses
Burials at the Imperial Crypt
Burials at St. Stephen's Cathedral, Vienna
18th-century Austrian people
18th-century Austrian women
Children of Maria Theresa
Royalty and nobility who died as children
Daughters of kings